Raksta is a locality situated in Tyresö Municipality, Stockholm County, Sweden with 746 inhabitants in 2010.

References 

Populated places in Tyresö Municipality